Raúl de la Cruz Chaparro (born 3 May 1953) is an Argentine former footballer who played at both professional and international levels as a midfielder. In 2012, he became manager of Sarmiento de Resistencia.

Career
Chaparro played club football for San Lorenzo de Almagro, Gimnasia y Esgrima de Jujuy, Tigre, Chacarita Juniors, San Martín de Tucumán, Instituto, River Plate, Rosario Central, Racing de Córdoba, Colón and Defensores de Belgrano.

He also earned one cap for Argentina in 1982.

References

1953 births
Living people
Argentine footballers
Argentina international footballers
Sarmiento de Resistencia
Association football midfielders
People from Formosa, Argentina